Gundleton is a village in Hampshire, England. It is in the civil parish of Bighton.

The village is notable for having taken place in the English Civil War, amongst the Battle of Cheriton.

Villages in Hampshire